The Mad Bomberg is a 1932 German comedy film directed by Georg Asagaroff and starring Hans Adalbert Schlettow, Liselotte Schaak, and Paul Heidemann. It is an adaptation of the 1923 novel The Mad Bomberg by Josef Winckler, which was later made into a 1957 film of the same title. The film's art direction was by Otto Erdmann and Hans Sohnle.

Cast

References

Bibliography

External links 
 

1932 films
Films of the Weimar Republic
German historical comedy films
1930s historical comedy films
1930s German-language films
Films directed by Georg Asagaroff
Films set in the 19th century
Films based on German novels
German black-and-white films
1932 comedy films
1930s German films